KAZV-LP was a low-power television station in Modesto, California, broadcasting locally on channel 14 as an affiliate of America One. Founded June 22, 1995, the station was owned by AZV Video Production, Inc.

Frank Azevedo “always wanted to own a TV station”   and in 1997, the Modesto area almond grower applied  to the FCC for a “limited power community broadcast license” and received it.    His station, KAZV-TV, Channel 14, Modesto,  operated out of a house on his farmstead, providing a steady stream of local-content programming plus classic movies and re-runs of popular shows from the past, such as I love Lucy, Bob Hope and The Andy Griffith show.

While helping his students apply for jobs with local media companies, he got to know the cable TV managers in the surrounding communities.  He also noticed that, at that time, unlike cable companies in the larger markets, such as Sacramento and Fresno,  local cable networks were not carrying local advertising.

Sensing a major opportunity for himself as well as local cable areas, he offered to provide a “turn key” service to sell and produce  ready-to-use advertising for them. The local managers referred him to corporate headquarters. His visits with the heads of the national cable companies earned him the green light to insert local commercials in CNN, ESPN and USA networks.

The nearest TV outlets are in Sacramento and Fresno,” he explained. “This area needed a TV station, so I started one.” Azevedo received his license in 1997 and set up shop in a house on his almond ranch.  Soon KAZV-TV, Channel 14 was on the air.  With links to two national networks,  KAZV-TV “cherry picks” the networks' programming such as hunting and fishing shows, golf, car shows, wrestling and a technology show called Tech 5.

The local-content programming included his favorite, the nightly show “Home Town Focus”. The show spotlighted local communities, providing information and entertainment indigenous to individual communities from Stockton to Merced. KAZV-TV ran as every-other-week, Tuesday night agricultural show hosted by the Stanislaus County Farm Bureau, it broadcast a political feature hosted by a local county supervisor, and set up shop at the County Fair each year for its full ten-day run.

A few years later, Azevedo applied for a new class of broadcast license, known as a limited power community broadcast license, the Federal Communications Commission (FCC) created in 1982 to serve areas that were considered underserved by conventional broadcasters. Rural Stanislaus County fit that description perfectly.

On July 12, 2006, the station filed an application to flash-cut to digital operations, at only 500 W.

KAZV-LP's license was cancelled by the Federal Communications Commission on September 8, 2014.

External links

Defunct television stations in the United States
AZV-LP
Modesto, California
Mass media in Merced County, California
Television channels and stations established in 1996
Television channels and stations disestablished in 2014
1996 establishments in California
2014 disestablishments in California
AZV-LP